Ibrayevo (İbray) is a rural locality (a village) in Ibrayevsky Selsoviet, Alsheyevsky District, Bashkortostan, Russia. The population was 241 as of 2010. There are 2 streets.

Geography 
Ibrayevo is located 15 km northeast of Rayevsky (the district's administrative centre) by road. Dyurtyuli is the nearest rural locality.

References 

Rural localities in Alsheyevsky District